Bresiliidae is a family of crustaceans belonging to the order Decapoda.

Genera:
 Bresilia Calman, 1896
 Encantada Wicksten, 1989

References

Decapods
Decapod families